Swan Song Records was a record label launched by the English rock band Led Zeppelin on 10 May 1974. It was overseen by Led Zeppelin's manager Peter Grant and was a vehicle for the band to promote its own products as well as sign artists who found it difficult to win contracts with other major labels. The decision to launch the label came after Led Zeppelin's five-year contract with Atlantic Records expired at the end of 1973, although Atlantic ultimately distributed the label's product.

Artists that released material on the Swan Song label included Led Zeppelin itself, solo releases by Led Zeppelin band members Jimmy Page and Robert Plant, Bad Company, Pretty Things, Dave Edmunds, Mirabai, Maggie Bell (and the short-lived band she fronted, Midnight Flyer), Detective, and Sad Café. In addition to these artists, two other noted recording acts (though not signed to the label) were credited artists on Swan Song singles, both of which were UK hits in 1981: BA Robertson sang a duet with Maggie Bell on the single "Hold Me", and Stray Cats backed Dave Edmunds on his 1981 single "The Race Is On".

Swan Song ceased active operations in 1983 and now exists only to reissue previously released material.

History
In January 1974, Led Zeppelin negotiated an agreement with Atlantic Records to set up Swan Song Records. The label was launched with parties in New York and Los Angeles. A lavish media party was also held at Chislehurst Caves in Kent on 31 October 1974, to celebrate the label's first UK release by the Pretty Things, Silk Torpedo (the first US release for Swan Song was the self-titled debut album from Bad Company in June 1974). The company logo, designed by Hipgnosis and illustrated by Joe Petagno, was based on Evening also called The Fall of Day (1869) by painter William Rimmer.

By April 1975, Swan Song had four albums (Bad Company, Silk Torpedo, Physical Graffiti, and Suicide Sal) in the Billboard Top 200 chart. The recording label also partly funded film projects such as Monty Python and the Holy Grail in 1975. In an interview he gave in January of that year, Page offered his perspective on the label:

Two years later, he elaborated on Led Zeppelin's intention to found the label:

Artists who signed with the label but did not produce any releases included Metropolis (which featured members from the Pretty Things), The Message (which featured future Bon Jovi members Alec John Such and Richie Sambora), and Itchy Brother (which featured future members of The Kentucky Headhunters). Artists that Swan Song Records wanted to sign but who bowed out to other labels were Roy Harper and blues guitarist Bobby Parker. When Swan Song's offices were cleared out in 1983, early demos from Iron Maiden, Heart and Paul Young's band Q-Tips were among those found, unplayed and stored, on the shelves.

Swan Song ceased operations in October 1983 due to the break-up of Led Zeppelin and Peter Grant's health problems. An attempt to save the label by Atlantic Records executive Phil Carson proved fruitless. Robert Plant started his own label, Es Paranza Records, in the wake of the closure of Swan Song, while Jimmy Page and John Paul Jones returned to Atlantic Records. Bad Company moved over to both Atlantic and its subsidiary Atco when they resumed in the late 1980s. Today, the label is strictly used for reissues of albums that were released by the label when it was active except in 2012 the label was resurrected when Led Zeppelin released the live Celebration Day document of their 2007 one-off reunion concert.

UK Address: 484 Kings Road, London, SW10 UK
US Address: 444 Madison Avenue, New York, New York, 10022 USA

Personnel
 Peter Grant – President
 Danny Goldberg – Vice-President (US) (1974–1976)
 Abe Hoch – Vice-President (UK) (1974–1976)
 Led Zeppelin – Executive Producers
 Phil Carson – Atlantic Records liaison
 Alan Callan – Vice-President (1977–1983)
 Stevens H. Weiss – Attorney (US)
 Joan Hudson – Attorney (UK)
 Mark London – Band security
 John Bindon – Security (1977)
 Mitchell Fox, Nancy Gurcsik – Assistants (US)
 Unity Maclean, Carole Brown, Cynthia Sach, Manique de Pinto, Sian Meredith – Assistants (UK)

Label discography

LPs
 15 June 1974 – SS-8410 – Bad Company – Bad Company
 1 November 1974 – SS-8411 – Silk Torpedo – Pretty Things
 24 February 1975 – SS-2-200 – Physical Graffiti – Led Zeppelin
 April 1975 – SS-8412 – Suicide Sal – Maggie Bell
 12 April 1975 – SS-8413 – Straight Shooter – Bad Company
 December 1975 – SS-8414 – Savage Eye – Pretty Things
 21 February 1976 – SS-8415 – Run with the Pack – Bad Company
 31 March 1976 – SS-8416 – Presence – Led Zeppelin
 28 September 1976 – SS-2-201 – The Song Remains the Same (soundtrack) – Led Zeppelin
 March 1977 – SS-8500 – Burnin' Sky – Bad Company
 April 1977 – SS-8417 – Detective – Detective
 April 1977 – SS-8418 – Get It – Dave Edmunds
 April 1978 – SS-8504 – It Takes One to Know One – Detective
 8 September 1978 – SS-8505 – Tracks on Wax 4 – Dave Edmunds
 17 March 1979 – SS-8506 – Desolation Angels – Bad Company
 5 July 1979 – SS-8507 – Repeat When Necessary – Dave Edmunds
 15 August 1979 – SS-16002 – In Through the Out Door – Led Zeppelin
 February 1981 – SS-8509 – Midnight Flyer – Midnight Flyer
 20 April 1981 – SS-16034 – Twangin'... – Dave Edmunds
 August 1981 – SS-16048 – Sad Café – Sad Café
 November 1981 – SS-8510 – Best of Dave Edmunds – Dave Edmunds
 February 1982 – SS-11002 – Rock 'n' Roll Party (mini LP) – Midnight Flyer
 15 February 1982 – SS-8511 – Death Wish II (soundtrack) – Jimmy Page
 28 June 1982 – SS-8512 – Pictures at Eleven – Robert Plant
 August 1982 – 90001 – Rough Diamonds – Bad Company
 19 November 1982 – 90051 – Coda – Led Zeppelin
 1983 – 90078 – Wildlife – Wildlife

Singles

Some of Swan Song's more notable singles include:

"Can't Get Enough/Little Miss Fortune" – Bad Company:  SS-70015 (US, 1974), SWS 70015 (Canada)
"Movin' On/Easy on My Soul" – Bad Company:  SS-70101 (US, 18 Jan. 1975), SWS 70101 (Canada)
"Trampled Under Foot/Black Country Woman" – Led Zeppelin:  SS-70102 (US, 2 April 1975; Australia), DC-1 (UK, 10 May 1975), SSK 19 402(N) (Germany, March 1975), SS 19402 (Holland), K 19402 (Italy, April 1975), 19 402 (France), P-1361N (Japan, April 1975), P-108N (Japan), 45-1205 (Spain), SWS 70102 (Canada), SNS 100 (South Africa)
"Good Lovin' Gone Bad/Whiskey Bottle" – Bad Company:  SS-70103 (US, 19 April 1975), SWS 70103 (Canada)
"Wishing Well/Comin' On Strong" – Maggie Bell: SS-70105 (US, June 1975)
"Feel Like Makin' Love/Wild Fire Woman" – Bad Company:  SS-70106 (US, August 1975), SWS 70106 (Canada)
"Candy Store Rock/Royal Orleans" – Led Zeppelin:  SS-70110 (US, 18 June 1976), SSK 19 407 (Germany, August 1976), 45-1381 (Spain), P-35N (Japan, September 1976), SWS 70110 (Canada)
"Here Comes The Weekend/As Lovers Do" – Dave Edmunds:  SSK 19408 (UK, 6 August 1976), SS 19 408 (Germany, September 1976), SS 19408 (Holland), 19 408 (France), 19408 (Belgium/Luxemburg)
"Burnin' Sky/Everything I Need" – Bad Company:  SS 70112 (US, 21 May 1977), SWS 70112 (Canada)
"Rock 'N' Roll Fantasy/Crazy Circles" – Bad Company:  SS 70119 (US, March 1979; Canada; New Zealand), SSK 19416 (UK, 16 February 1979; Australia), SS 19 416 (Germany, March 1976), SS 19.416 (Holland), W 19416 (Italy), 19 416 (France, May 1979), 45-1835 (Spain), N-S-20-1 (Portugal), P-382N (Japan, March 1979), 200088 (Argentina)
"A1 on the Juke Box/It's My Own Business" – Dave Edmunds:  SSK 19417 (UK, February 1979)
"Gone, Gone, Gone/Take The Time" – Bad Company:  SS 71000 (US, July 1979; Canada, August 1979; New Zealand), P-453N (Japan, August 1979)
"Girls Talk" – Dave Edmunds:  SS 71001 (US & Canada, August 1979; New Zealand), SSK 19418 (UK, June 1979; Australia), SSK 19418 C (UK clear vinyl, 8 August 1979), SS 19 418 (Germany, August 1979), SS 19.418 (Holland/Belgium), 45-1898 (Spain)
"Queen of Hearts/The Creature From The Black Lagoon" – Dave Edmunds:  SSK 19419 (UK, September 1979; Australia), SS 19 419 (Germany, 26 October 1979), SS-19.419 (Holland/Belgium), DJ SS 71002 (Canada)
"Fool in the Rain/Hot Dog" – Led Zeppelin:  SS 71003 (US, 7 December 1979; Canada; Australia; New Zealand), SS 19 421 (Germany, February 1980), SS 19.421 (Holland/Belgium), PROMO 097 (Italy), W 19421 (Italy), 45-1925 (Spain), P-530N (Japan, February 1980)
"Singing The Blues/Boys Talk" – Dave Edmunds:  SSK 19422 (UK, January 1980; Australia), SS 19422 (Germany, March 1980), 19 422 (France)
"All My Love" – Led Zeppelin :  11.105 (Brazil), DIF. 132 (Argentina)
"Almost Saturday Night/You'll Never Get Me Up (In One of Those)" – Dave Edmunds:  SS 72000 (US, March 1981), SSK 19424 (UK, 10 April 1981; Australia; New Zealand), SS 19 424 (Germany,
"Who's To Blame (Death Wish Title)/Carole's Theme" – Jimmy Page:  P-1673 (Japan, July 1982)
"Big Log/Far Post" – Robert Plant:  7-99844 (US, September 1983; Australia), P-1786 (Japan, September 1983), 79 98447 (Canada)

Promo discs
 1978 – LAAS-002 – "Live from the Atlantic Studios" – Detective
 1978 – PR-230 – "College Radio Presents Dave Edmunds" – Dave Edmunds
 July 1982 – SAM-154 – "Pictures at Eleven – Interview with Alan Freeman" – Robert Plant

See also
 List of record labels
 Led Zeppelin

References

External links
Swan Song Album Discography
Spirit of Metal discography

 
British record labels
Companies based in the Royal Borough of Kensington and Chelsea
Companies based in New York City
Record labels established in 1974
Record labels disestablished in 1983
Rock record labels
Led Zeppelin
King's Road, Chelsea, London